LeChaunce Shepherd (born August 22, 1974 in Milwaukee, Wisconsin) is an American former boxer. He is a two time amateur national champion.

Amateur highlights
1996 U.S. Olympic Trials at Light Welterweight, eliminated by David Diaz on points
1997 United States Amateur Welterweight Champion
1999 3rd place as a Welterweight at United States Amateur Championships. Results were:
Defeated Ramon Olivas on points
Defeated James Webb on points
Lost to Arturo Morales on points
1999 2nd place as a Welterweight at National Golden Gloves. Results were:
Defeated Arturo Morales on points
Defeated Mike Balasi on points
Defeated Bobby Joe Valdez on points
Defeated James Webb on points
Lost to Dante Craig on points
1999 Welterweight Bronze Medalist at Pan-American Games in Winnipeg, Canada. Results were:
Defeated Isaac Caballero (Nicaragua) TKO 1
Defeated Espitia Calderon (Colombia) on points
Lost to Juan Hernandez Sierra (Cuba) on points
2000 United States Amateur Welterweight Champion
2000 Olympic Trials as a Welterweight, lost to Dante Craig

Professional career
Shepherd turned pro in 2000 and had success.  He walked away from boxing in 2002 with a record of 4 wins and 1 loss.

References

External links
 

1974 births
Living people
Boxers from Wisconsin
Welterweight boxers
Winners of the United States Championship for amateur boxers
Sportspeople from Milwaukee
American male boxers
Boxers at the 1999 Pan American Games
Pan American Games medalists in boxing
Pan American Games bronze medalists for the United States
Medalists at the 1999 Pan American Games